The Scandinavian Tourist Board (STB) is a joint initiative by the national tourist boards of Denmark, Norway, and Sweden. STB is responsible for promoting Scandinavia and Scandinavian tourism products in Asia-Pacific with particular emphasis on the major markets of Japan and China.

History
In 1967, the Danish Tourist Board, as the first of the three Scandinavian NTOs (national tourist board), set up a market office in Tokyo. When Sweden joined in 1986, STB was born. Norway entered into the Scandinavian fellowship one year later.

Organization
STB is fully owned by VisitDenmark (formerly the Danish Tourist Board), Innovation Norway (which includes the former Norwegian Tourist Board), and VisitSweden (formerly the Swedish Travel & Tourism Council). The STB regional head office is located in Tokyo, while Beijing, Guangzhou, Copenhagen, Mumbai, and Sydney are home to STB market offices and representatives. STB is headed by Søren Leerskov since 1995 and has 28 staff in the region.

References

External links
Scandinavian Tourist Board
GoScandinavia.com

Tourism agencies
Tourism in Denmark
Tourism in Norway
Tourism in Sweden